Kuntur Puna (Quechua kuntur condor, puna an ecoregion near the Andes, "condor puna", Hispanicized spelling Condor Puna, Condorpuna, Cóndor Puna, Cóndorpuna) is a mountain  in the Andes of Peru. It is located in the Amazonas Region, Luya Province, Conila District, and in the Utcubamba Province, in the districts Jamalca and Lonya Grande. It is one of the area's tallest mountains.

See also 
Carachupa

References

Mountains of Amazonas Region